The Dallas Rangemaster Treble Booster was an effects unit made for guitarists in the 1960s. Its function was two-fold: to increase the signal strength of the guitar going into the amplifier, and to increase tones at the high end of the spectrum (a treble booster).

The need for a treble booster arose in the mid-1960s, as British tube amplifiers such as the Vox AC30 or Marshall JTM45 tended to produce a slightly dark, muddy sound when overdriven, particularly when used with humbucking pickups. A pre-amplifier that also boosted treble proved a solution. Additionally, the vintage components in the Rangemaster circuitry could add characteristic distortion and overtones to color the guitar sound, much in the way of the more modern overdrive pedals.

History and description 

The Rangemaster Treble Booster was first made in the 1960s by London company Dallas Musical Ltd., incorporated in 1959. It made guitars and amplifiers under different brand names, including Dallas, Shaftesbury, and Rangemaster. The Rangemaster's engineer is unknown.

The unit is simple and consists of a grey metal box with an on/off switch, a potentiometer for the booster setting, and in- and output jacks. It is made to stand on top of an amplifier rather than on the floor. Besides the potentiometer (usually 10k, sometimes 20k) and the on/off switch, the circuitry contains one germanium transistor, four capacitors, three resistors, and a battery. The transistor was a Mullard or unbranded OC44 or Mullard OC71.

By the 1980s, Treble Boosters had gone out of fashion. 
The number of Rangemaster Treble Boosters that were built is unknown. Due to limited supply on the second hand market, they are collectible, despite the price being a fraction of what it used to be in the mid-2000s. In Premier Guitar, Kenny Rardin describes his quest for one of the effects, which started with puzzlement over how Eric Clapton and Ritchie Blackmore achieved their tone; he spent years looking for a Rangemaster.

Other notable users whose sound depended heavily on the Rangemaster include Rory Gallagher, Brian May, Tony Iommi, Marc Bolan and Billy Gibbons.

Rumours of Eric Clapton having used a Rangemaster during his stint with John Mayall's Blues Breakers have never been confirmed. Photos of the recording sessions of the "Blues Breakers With Eric Clapton" exist, but a Rangemaster Treble Booster is not visible in any of them. It is assumed the rumours started in the late 1990s when clones of the Rangemaster Treble Booster began to appear.

References 

Effects units